The 2022 Tennessee Tech Golden Eagles football team represented Tennessee Technological University  as a member of the Ohio Valley Conference (OVC) during the 2022 NCAA Division I FCS football season. They were led by fifth-year head coach Dewayne Alexander and played their games at Tucker Stadium in Cookeville, Tennessee.

Previous season

The Golden Eagles finished the 2021 season 3–8, 1–5 in OVC play to finish in a tie for last place.

Schedule

Game summaries

at Kansas

Texas A&M–Commerce

No. 24 Samford

at No. 15 UT Martin

at No. 21 Southeast Missouri State

Tennessee State

at Kennesaw State

at Eastern Illinois

Lindenwood

at North Alabama

North Carolina Central

References

Tennessee Tech
Tennessee Tech Golden Eagles football seasons
Tennessee Tech Golden Eagles football